In the US Army, Patrick Matlock is the Deputy Chief of Staff for Operations, Plans, and Training (G-3/5/7) serving on Army Staff for operations (G-3), plans (G-5), and training (G-7). Both G-8 and G-3/5/7 sit on the Army Requirements Oversight Council (AROC), chaired by the Chief of Staff  of the Army (CSA). 

The Army's Force management model begins with a projection of the Future operating environment, in terms of resources: political, military, economic, social, information, infrastructure, physical environment, and the time available to bring the Current army to bear on the situation.

The AROC serves as a discussion forum of these factors.

A DOTMLPF analysis models the factors necessary to change the Current force into a relevant Future force.

The relevant strategy is provided by the Army's leadership to guide Army staff.

The resources are "dictated by Congress".

A JCIDS process identifies the gaps in capability between Current and Future force.

A Force design to meet the materiel gaps is then underway.

An organization with the desired capabilities (manpower, materiel, training) is brought to bear on each gap.

AR 5-22(pdf) lists the Force modernization proponent for each Army branch, which can be a CoE or Branch proponent leader.
Army Staff uses a Synchronization meeting before seeking approval —HTAR Force Management 3-2b: "Managing change in any large, complex organization requires the synchronization of many interrelated processes".

A budget request is submitted to Congress.

Approved requests then await resource deliveries which then become available to the combatant commanders.

Notes

Department of the Army staff
Military simulation